| tries ={{#expr: 
 + 5 + 2
 + 4 + 3
 + 5 + 3
}}
| top point scorer    = Florin Vlaicu (Romania)(51 points)
| top try scorer      = Cătălin Fercu (Romania)(3 tries)
| venue               = 
| attendance2         = 
| champions           = 
| count               = 2
| runner-up           = 
| website             = IRB Nations Cup
| previous year       = 2012
| previous tournament = 2012 IRB Nations Cup
| next year           = 2014
| next tournament     = 2014 IRB Nations Cup
}}
The 2013 IRB Nations Cup was the eighth edition of the international rugby union tournament, a competition created by the International Rugby Board.  For the seventh time in a row, it was held in Bucharest, Romania.  It was played between 8 June and 16 June and ran alongside the 2013 IRB Tbilisi Cup in Georgia. All fixtures were played at the 5,000 capacity Stadionul Naţional de Rugby, the Home stadium for Hosts .

Hosts  were joined by ENC side  and regular A sides Italy A and 2012 IRB Nations cup runners-up, Argentina Jaguars.

Romania retained the title they won in 2012 by winning all three of their matches.

Standings

Fixtures

Matchday 1

Matchday 2

Matchday 3

Top scorers

Top points scorers

Top try scorers

See also
 2013 IRB Pacific Nations Cup
 2013 IRB Tbilisi Cup

References

External links

2013
2013 rugby union tournaments for national teams
International rugby union competitions hosted by Romania
2012–13 in Romanian rugby union
2012–13 in Italian rugby union
2013 in Argentine rugby union
2013 in Russian rugby union
Sport in Bucharest